The Global Forum on Agricultural Research and Innovation (GFAR)  is an inclusive global forum, enabling all those concerned with the future of agriculture and its role in development around the world, to address key global needs. GFAR provides an open forum for stakeholders across the agricultural spectrum—ranging from researchers, organizations, and farmers—to participate in collaborative discussion and action around the current and future state of agriculture.

Established in 1996, GFAR was formed as a project for resource sharing. GFAR facilitates collaboration, partnerships, and sharing of objectives along the complex pathways from research through to development outcomes.

GFAR's headquarters is in Rome, Italy, where it is hosted by FAO and it's current chair is Dr. Ravinder Kumar Khetarpal.

History 
GFAR was established initially by World Bank, IFAD, FAO, International Service for National Agricultural Research | ISNAR and SDC on 31 October 1996, triggered by a major shift in thinking about development during that period.  This entailed a new recognition of the need to include all development stakeholders in development processes, to make them more effective, owned by the intended beneficiary countries and communities, self-driven and resilient.

Recognizing this shift, the United Nations inter-governmental agriculture and food-related development organizations FAO, IFAD, CGIAR partnership of 15 international agricultural research centres (IARCs), the national agricultural research and development systems of countries from South and North through their regional bodies and representatives of civil society, the private sector and farmer organizations, came together to establish GFAR.

The first gatherings for the stakeholders were the GFAR Triennial Conferences. The first was held in Dresden, Germany, in May 2000, on "Strengthening research partnerships in the globalized world of the turn of century". The second was held in Dakar, Senegal, in 2003 with the theme "Linking Research and Rural Innovation to Sustainable Development". The third was held in New Delhi, India, in 2006 with the theme "Reorienting Agricultural Research to meet the Millennium Development Goals (MDGs)".

Subsequently, the meetings were replaced by Global Conferences on Agricultural Research for Development (GCARD), along with the Annual General Meetings of CGIAR.  The Global Conference on Agricultural Research for Development 2010 (GCARD1) was held in Montpellier, France, from 28–31 March 2010, on the theme “Enhancing Development Impact from Research: Building on Demand”.

The Global Conference on Agricultural Research for Development 2012 (GCARD2) was held in Uruguay, 29 October–1 November 2012, on the theme "Foresight and Partnership for Innovation and Impact on Smallholder Livelihoods".

Goal, objectives and pillars 
GFAR's goal is to ensure that agricultural innovation systems, encompassing research, extension, education, and enterprise - deliver the best development outcomes to resource-poor farmers and rural communities.

GFAR seeks to ensure agricultural innovation and delivers its intended development impact through

 Collective Advocacy: enable dialogue among all sectors to identify key current and future priorities in agricultural research, innovation and rural development and advocate for key needs to be addressed. 
 Partnership Development: help build effective and equitable partnerships among diverse actors to address the complex issues along innovation pathways to impacts,  
 Transforming Institutions: catalyze collective actions developing the capabilities and creating the transformative changes required in institutions to enable greater impacts for those they serve and 
 Sharing & Using Knowledge: mobilize the access, availability and use of agricultural knowledge and technologies for development purposes.

The GCARD Roadmap describes the broad transformative changes needed in national systems, as articulated by the sector. In contrast, GFAR's Medium Term Plan sets out how GFAR will get there, specifying the practical actions GFAR needs to take collectively through six Work Streams, each one with a concrete outcome:

 Foresight for Better Futures: Farmers and national stakeholders are empowered and informed to better negotiate their own agricultural futures. 
 Partnerships for Impact: Equitable and effective demand-driven partnerships to transform agricultural research and innovation into meaningful impacts at scale.
 Transformative Investments: Transformative AR4D investments provide tangible opportunities for the world's poor.
 Capacities for Change: Collective initiatives fostered to improve capacity in Agricultural Research for Development.
 Research in Society: Agriculture and innovation are embedded into rural development agendas.
 Accountability for Action: Accountability, transformational change and development impacts in Agricultural Research for Development systems increased through more effective governance and greater and more transparent stakeholder involvement.

Gender in Agriculture Partnership 
According to FAO, approximately 70% of all farmers in the developing world are women. If access to new technology, training, and resources is made available to these farmers, yields could increase by 20 to 30% and could reduce the number of hungry people in the world by 100 to 150 million people.

To tackle this issue, GFAR stakeholders launched in March 2012 the Gender in Agriculture Partnership (GAP) at the first Global Conference on Women in Agriculture in New Delhi, India.

GAP's vision is to ensure transformed agriculture where gender equity enables food, nutrition and income security for the rural poor.

The Forum’s Stakeholders 
GFAR's actions are mobilized and delivered through the partnerships, collaborative networks and institutions brought together through the Forum, as determined by their representatives in the multi-stakeholder GFAR Steering Committee.

GFAR's Steering Committee involves all categories of stakeholders that work in the agricultural world:

Regional Fora
 AARINENA - Association of Agricultural Research Institutions in the Near East and North Africa, Amman, Jordan; 
 APAARI - Asia Pacific Association of Agricultural Research Institutions, Bangkok, Thailand;
 CACAARI - Central Asia and the Caucasus Association of Agricultural Research Institutions, Tashkent, Uzbekistan; 
 EFARD - European Forum on Agricultural Research and Development, Brussels, Belgium;
 FARA - Forum for Agricultural Research in Africa, Accra, Ghana;
 FORAGRO - Forum for the Americas on Agricultural Research and Technology Development, San José, Costa Rica.

International Agricultural Research Centres (IARCs)

 CGIAR - Consultative Group for International Agricultural Research, Montpellier, France.

Farmers Organizations

 AFA - Asian Farmers’ Organization, Quezon City, Philippines;
 WFO - World Farmers’ Organisation, Rome, Italy.

Private sector

 PANAAC - Pan African Agribusiness and Agro Industry Consortium, Nairobi, Kenya;
 SAI Platform - Sustainable Agriculture Initiative Platform, Brussels, Belgium.

Advisory Services

 GFRAS - Global Forum on Rural Advisory Services, Lindau, Switzerland.

Education Institutions

 GCHERA - Global Confederation of Higher Education Associations for the Agricultural and Life Sciences, Alberta, Canada.

Facilitating Agencies

 FAO - Food and Agriculture Organization, Rome, Italy;
 IFAD - International Fund for Agricultural Development, Rome, Italy.

Youth Organizations

FAO states that in the next 35 years the world's population will increase from 7 billion to over 10 billion. At the same time, agriculture is an aging and undervalued profession in which there is a declining interest among young people.

Young professionals face numerous challenges including making their voices heard and exerting influence in the field of AR4D. Lack of youth involvement in AR4D has negative implications for the sector, reducing the potential for innovation, use of new communication technologies, inclusivity, and future sustainability. In response to this, on 8 November 2006, during the triennial conference of the GFAR, in New Delhi, India: the Young Professional's Platform for Agricultural Research for Development (YPARD) was officially launched, and it is now hosted by the GFAR Secretariat.

References

External links 
GFAR website
Gender in Agriculture Partnership  powered by GFAR
Young Professionals in Agricultural Development hosted by GFAR

Agricultural research